Richard Taylor (1834–1890) was a Union Army soldier during the American Civil War. He received the Medal of Honor for gallantry during the Battle of Cedar Creek fought near Middletown, Virginia on October 19, 1864. The battle was the decisive engagement of Major General Philip Sheridan's Valley Campaigns of 1864 and was the largest battle fought in the Shenandoah Valley.

Taylor joined the Army from Indiana in August 1861, and mustered out with his regiment in August 1865.

Medal of Honor citation

"The President of the United States of America, in the name of Congress, takes pleasure in presenting the Medal of Honor to Private Richard Taylor, United States Army, for extraordinary heroism on 19 October 1864, while serving with Company E, 18th Indiana Infantry, in action at Cedar Creek, Virginia, for capture of flag."

See also

 List of Medal of Honor recipients
 List of American Civil War Medal of Honor recipients: T–Z

References

External links
 Military Times Hall of Valor
  – cenotaph

1834 births
1890 deaths
People from Madison County, Alabama
People of Alabama in the American Civil War
People of Indiana in the American Civil War
Union Army soldiers
United States Army Medal of Honor recipients
American Civil War recipients of the Medal of Honor